Capela de Ánimas is a church in Santiago de Compostela, Province of A Coruña, Galicia, Spain. It was completed in 1788.

Churches in Galicia (Spain)
Buildings and structures in the Province of A Coruña
Roman Catholic churches completed in 1788
1788 establishments in Spain
18th-century Roman Catholic church buildings in Spain